Choi Jeong (Hangul: 최정; born February 28, 1987, in Icheon, South Korea) is a third baseman who has played his whole career for the SK Wyverns (known as the SSG Landers beginning in 2021) in the Korea Baseball Organization. He bats and throws right-handed. Choi's 368 career home runs rank second on the KBO all-time list. His 294 career hit-by-pitches (HBP) is the most in the KBO as well as the world record. He got 288th hit by pitch in 2021 and surpassed Hughie Jennings' 287 hit by pitch.

Education
Suwon Yushin High School
Anyang Pyongchon Middle School
Seongnam Daeil Elementary School

Amateur career
While playing for Yushin High School in Suwon, Gyeonggi-do, South Korea, he batted 4th and threw in the mid-90s, playing all nine positions as a No.1 starting pitcher and position player.

In July 2004, Choi was selected for the South Korea national junior team as a pitcher and participated in the 2004 World Junior Baseball Championship held in Taiwan. Choi started South Korea's first match in the preliminary round, and pitched 5 innings and gave up a run, leading his team to a 5–2 victory over Italy. South Korea eventually won the bronze medal at the competition.

In December 2004, he was named best high school batter of the year.

Notable international careers

Professional career
Signed by the SK Wyverns, Choi made his pro league debut in the 2005 season. He was successful as both a starting pitcher and a slugger in high school, but finally decided to be a full-time batter for his pro career.

As a third baseman, he had several mediocre seasons, but broke out in 2007 when he had 109 hits, 16 home runs and batted .267.

In 2008, Choi helped his team to become two-time Korean Series Champions, and he was finally named the series MVP.

In 2016 and 2017, Choi became the best power-hitter in the KBO, leading the league in home runs both seasons, with 40 and 46 home runs, respectively.

Choi became a free agent after the 2018 season, staying with the Wyverns at 10.6 billion won in total for six years.

In 2019 Choi led the league in HBP with 26; it was the seventh time he had 20+ HBP in 11 seasons. He was hit by pitch another 20 times in 2020.

See also 
 List of KBO career home run leaders 
 List of KBO career RBI leaders

References

External links
Career statistics and player information from Korea Baseball Organization

Choi Jeong at SK Wyverns Baseball Club 
Choi Jeong Fancafe at Naver 

1987 births
2009 World Baseball Classic players
2013 World Baseball Classic players
Asian Games gold medalists for South Korea
Asian Games medalists in baseball
Baseball players at the 2010 Asian Games
KBO League third basemen
Korean Series MVPs
Living people
Medalists at the 2010 Asian Games
People from Icheon
SSG Landers players
South Korean baseball players
Sportspeople from Gyeonggi Province
2023 World Baseball Classic players